George Alexander may refer to:

In arts and entertainment 
George Alexander (actor) (1858–1918), British actor
George Alexander (American musician) (1867–1913), American recording pioneer
George Alexander (Scottish musician), stage name of Alexander Young (1938–1997), singer and guitarist of the band Grapefruit

In government, military, and politics 
George Alexander (American politician) (1839–1923), mayor of Los Angeles
George Alexander (Canadian politician) (1814–1903), former member of the Canadian Senate
George A. Alexander (1884–1969), 35th Naval Governor of Guam
George F. Alexander (1882–1948), US District Court judge in Alaska
George T. Alexander (1971–2005), US Army soldier
George W. Alexander (1904–1992), Pennsylvania politician
George Warren Alexander (1829–1903), military officer in Pennsylvania

In sports 

George Alexander (Australian cricketer) (1851–1930), Australian Test cricketer
George Alexander (English cricketer) (1842–1913), English cricketer
George Alexander (Canadian football) (born 1918), Canadian football running back
George Alexander (footballer) (born 2001), English footballer
George Alexander (lacrosse) (1886–1929), British lacrosse player

In other fields 

George Moyer Alexander (1914–1983), bishop of the Episcopal Diocese of Upper South Carolina
George William Alexander (1802–1890), English banker, abolitionist and philanthropist

See also
Georg Alexander, Duke of Mecklenburg (1921–1996), head of the House of Mecklenburg-Strelitz
Georg Alexander (1888–1945), German actor
George Alexander Trebek (1940–2020), host of Jeopardy!

Alexander George (disambiguation)